Joni Nissinen (born 21 April 1991) is a Finnish footballer currently playing for Finnish Veikkausliiga club KuPS.

References
  veikkausliiga.com
  Veikkausliiga Hall of Fame
  KuPS ja puolustaja Joni Nissinen jatkosopimukseen

1991 births
Living people
Finnish footballers
Kuopion Palloseura players
Veikkausliiga players
Association football defenders